Tom Beach (born January 18, 1955) is an American gymnast. He competed in eight events at the 1976 Summer Olympics.

References

External links
 

1955 births
Living people
American male artistic gymnasts
Olympic gymnasts of the United States
Gymnasts at the 1976 Summer Olympics
Sportspeople from Buffalo, New York
Pan American Games medalists in gymnastics
Pan American Games silver medalists for the United States
Gymnasts at the 1983 Pan American Games